Intermedia, Latin for "across multiple channels", is a concept in the arts.

Intermedia may also refer to:

 Intermedia (hypertext), a hypertext system at Brown University
 InterMedia Partners, a private equity investment firm focused on the media sector
 Intermedia (production company), a film studio
 InterMedia Entertainment Company, a production company founded by Fred Silverman in 1982, later renamed The Fred Silverman Company
 Intermedia (artists' association), a Canadian artists' association active in the late 1960s and early 1970s
 InterMedia, Russia's international media news agency

and also:
 División Intermedia, the second-tier football league in Paraguay
 Kansai Intermedia, a Japanese company broadcasting the FM radio FM Cocolo
 La intermedia, a rural municipality and village in Jujuy Province in Argentina
 Oracle interMedia, a feature providing multimedia utilities in an Oracle database environment
 Precis Intermedia Gaming, a publishing company distributing PDF-based and traditional printed role-playing games

Biology
 Thalassaemia intermedia, a form of the inherited autosomal recessive blood disease Thalassaemia

Anatomy
 Massa intermedia, the medial surface of the thalamus
 Pars intermedia, the boundary between the anterior and posterior lobes of the pituitary

Taxonomy
 Acacia aneura var. intermedia, a perennial shrub or tree variety native to Australia
 Amsinckia menziesii var. intermedia, the common fiddleneck or intermediate fiddleneck,  a plant species found in western North America
 Balaenoptera musculus intermedia, a subspecies of  the blue whale found the Southern Ocean
 Forsythia × intermedia, the border forsythia, an ornamental deciduous shrub species of garden origin
 Hamamelis × intermedia, the hybrid witch hazel, a plant species
 , the lavendin, the most cultivated lavender species for commercial use
 Meleagris gallopavo intermedia, the Rio Grande wild turkey, a bird subspecies
 Pleurothallis renipetala var. intermedia, a synonym for Acianthera crinita, an orchid species
 Python molurus intermedia, a subspecies of the snake Python molurus
 Rhea americana intermedia, a subspecies of the greater rhea found in Uruguay and extreme southeastern Brazil
 Tiliqua scincoides intermedia, the Northern blue-tongued skink, a lizard species native to Australia

See also
 Intermedium
 Intermedius